1973 Soviet Second League was a Soviet competition in the Soviet Second League.

Qualifying groups

Group I [Ukraine]

Group II [Soviet Northwest]

Group III [Russian South and Caucasus]

Group IV [Russia and Georgia]

Group V [Volga and Ural]

Group VI (Central Asia)

Group VII (Siberia and the Far East)

Promotion playoffs

Final group 
 [Nov 4-20, Sochi]

References
 All-Soviet Archive Site
 Results. RSSSF

Soviet Second League seasons
3
Soviet
Soviet